Kalateh-ye Ali Avaz (also Romanized as Kalāteh-ye ‘Alī Avaẕ and Kalāteh ‘Alī Avaz; also known as Kalāt-e ‘Alī ‘Avaẕ, ‘Alī ‘Avaz, and ‘Ali Āwaz) is a village in Arabkhaneh Rural District, Shusef District, Nehbandan County, South Khorasan Province, Iran. At the 2006 census, its population was 12, in 4 families.

References 

Populated places in Nehbandan County